Eunausibius is a genus of beetles in the family Silvanidae, containing the following species:

 Eunausibius elongatus Grouvelle
 Eunausibius lophius Parsons
 Eunausibius salutaris Parsons
 Eunausibius tenebrionoides Grouvelle
 Eunausibius wheeleri Schwarz & Barber

References

Silvanidae genera